The Image-Guided Surgery Toolkit (IGSTK: pronounced IGStick) is a software package oriented to facilitate the development of image-guided surgery applications.

IGSTK is an open-source software toolkit designed to enable biomedical researchers to rapidly prototype and create new applications for image-guided surgery. This toolkit provides functionalities that are commonly needed when implementing image-guided surgery applications, such as integration with optical and electromagnetic trackers, manipulation and visualization of DICOM datasets.

History
The development of IGSTK was funded by the US National Institute of Biomedical Imaging and Bioengineering, one of the US National Institutes of Health NIH. Development started in 2003 as a collaboration between the ISIS Center at Georgetown University and Kitware. In 2004 a team from the CADDLab at the University of North Carolina at Chapel Hill joined the project. Atamai a firm dedicated to development of image-guided surgery toolkits, joined in 2005.

The project has been supported by several vendors of trackers.

License
 IGSTK is distributed as open-source software, under a BSD license.
 It allows unrestricted use, including use in commercial products IGSTK License.
 The copyright of IGSTK is held by the Insight Software Consortium.

See also

ITK
CMake
CPack
VTK
3DSlicer
FLTK
Qt (toolkit)

Use in Other Projects
 CISST
 Slicer - IGSTK Integration

External links

IGSTK wiki
IGSTK: The Book
Georgetown University, ISIS Center
Kitware homepage
Kitware on Wikipedia

References
 IGSTK: Development Process and Project Management Best Practices for an Open Source Software Toolkit for Image-Guided Surgery Applications
 IGSTK: A State Machine Architecture for an Open Source Software Toolkit for Image-Guided Surgery Applications
 Robot Assisted Needle Placement: Application developed using an open source image guided surgery toolkit (IGSTK)
 An Architecture Validation Toolset for Ensuring Patient Safety in an Open Source Software Toolkit for Image-Guided Surgery Applications

 An open source software toolkit for image-guided surgery Kevin Cleary, Luis Ibanez, David Gobbi, and Kevin Gary, 

Free software programmed in C++